Tula Lotay is the pen name of Lisa Wood, an English comic book artist. She is known for illustrating Supreme: Blue Rose, written by Warren Ellis for Image Comics, and for founding the Thought Bubble Festival, the UK's largest comics convention. She was also an artist for Si Spencer's eight-part series Bodies, published by Vertigo.

Biography
Lotay grew up in Batley, West Yorkshire. She was adopted when she was a young child and had dyslexia. She attended Dewsbury College and the University of Bradford.

In 2007, while an employee of the local comics and board game retailer Travelling Man, she founded the annual Thought Bubble Festival to promote comic books to the general public, especially children with reading difficulties. Before becoming a comics artist, she was on the British Comic Awards Committee but resigned in 2013 to pursue a full-time art career.

Her first work was the cover art for Elephantmen #5 (2012), and in American Vampire: Anthology #1 (2013). She has also contributed to Red Sonja.

She illustrated issue #13 of The Wicked + The Divine, which was published in 2015 and nominated for a GLAAD Media Award for Outstanding Comic Book.

Lotay and her Supreme collaborator Warren Ellis announced in 2015 that they were working on a new comic, Heartless. As of early 2018, Heartless has yet to be released, but work was in progress.

In early 2022, Lotay stepped down as manager of the Thought Bubble Festival in order to concentrate on her art career and family.

Awards 
In 2019, in recognition for her work in creating the Thought Bubble Festival, Lotay was awarded the Bob Clampett Humanitarian Award  at the San Diego Comic-Con Eisner Awards. Upon receiving the award, Lotay said:

Bibliography

Interior art

DC Comics/Vertigo Comics
 All Star Batman #7 (2017)
 American Vampire: Anthology #1  (2013)
 Bodies #1-8 (2014)
 The Witching Hour: One Shot (2013)

Dynamite Entertainment
 Legends of Red Sonja #3 (2014)

Image Comics
 Elephantmen #45 (2012)
 Supreme: Blue Rose #1-7 (2014)
 Thought Bubble Anthology #1: The Hound (2011)
 Thought Bubble Anthology #2: A Significant Portraiture (2012)
 The Wicked + The Divine #13 (2015)
 Zero #18 (2015)

Marvel Comics
 Scarlet Witch: Volume 2 #8 (2016)

Comixology Originals
 Barnstormers: A Ballad of Love and Murder #1-Present (2022- )

Cover art

Archie Comics
 Archie: Volume 2 #17C (2017)
 Betty & Veronica #1O (2016) 
 Josie and the Pussycats #2C (2016) 
 Jughead: Volume 3 #12C

Boom! Studios
 Curb Stomp #1A (2015)
 Fiction #1C (2015)
 Grass Kings #4B (2017)
 Joyride #1B (2016)
 Mighty Morphin Power Rangers #3E (2016)

Dark Horse Comics
 Briggs Land #1-6 (2016)
 Briggs Land #3B NYCC Exclusive  (2016)
 Rebels #1-10 (2015 -2016)
 Tomb Raider:Volume 3 #7-12 (2016-2017)
 Night of the Ghoul #1B (2022)

Darryl Makes Comics
 DMC #1.5 Thought Bubble 2nd Print Variant (2015)

DC Comics/Vertigo
 All Star Batman #7A, #7C (2017)
 Black Canary: Volume 4 #1B (2015)
 Everafter: From the pages of Fables #1-10 (2016–17)
 Hellblazer #11 - 12A (2017)
 Shade the Changing Girl #1B
 Slash and Burn #1-6 (2015 -2016)
 The Wildstorm #1B (2017)

Dynamite Entertainment
 Blackcross #1B, #2A-6A Regular Covers (2015)
 Blackcross #1M,  #2E-6E Virgin Art Covers (2015)
 Dejah Thoris #1C (2016) 
 James Bond: Moneypenny #1A (2017) 
 Miss Fury #1A-5A Regular Covers (2016)
 Miss Fury #1E-2E Virgin Art Covers (2016)
 Red Sonja: Volume 3  #1C (2016)
 Swords of Sorrow #1F, 2A-6A Regular Covers (2015)
 Swords of Sorrow #1Q, 2D-6D Virgin Art Covers (2015)
 Vampirella: Volume 4 #1C (2016)

Great Beast
 Blood Blokes #3 Rear Cover (2013)

IDW Publishing
 Archangel #1-5 (2016-2017)
 Jem and the Holograms #7C (2015)

Image Comics
 Codename Baboushka: Conclave of Death #1B
 Elephantmen #29 Flip Cover (2010), #54 (2013)
 Intersect #3B
 Southern Cross #1C Ghost Variant (2016)
 Supreme: Blue Rose #1-7 (2014)
 Supreme: Blue Rose #1 Travelling Man Exclusive (2014)
 Supreme: Blue Rose #1 SDCC Exclusive (2014)
 Wayward #14B (2016)
 The Wicked +The Divine #13B (2015)
 Zero #18A (2015)

Independent
 North Bend #1B "Kickstarter Project" (2016)
 Girl With No Name (2019)
 Legion M

Marvel Comics
 The Amazing Spider-Man: Volume 4 #9E Women of Power Variant (2016)
 Black Widow: Volume 7 #1C (2016)
 Captain America: Sam Wilson #12B (2016) 
 Civil War II: Choosing Sides #6B (2016)
 Gamora #1E (2016)
 Guardians of the Galaxy: Volume 4 #16C (2017)
 Star Wars: Han Solo #2C (2016) 
 Vision: Volume 3 #2C (2015)

Titan Books
 Penny Dreadful #4A (2016)
 Vikings #1E Fried Pie Variant (2016)
 World War Tank Girl #2C (2017)

Valiant Comics
 4001 A.D. #1B-4B (2016)
 Bloodshot Reborn #10E, #11D, #12D, #13C (2016)
 Divinity II #2D, #4D (2016) 
 Faith: Volume 2 #2F (2016)

Art Books
 Dirge 
 Pequod
 Salome 
 Sequoia

References

External links
 

Alumni of the University of Bradford
British female comics artists
English comics artists
Living people
People from Batley
People from Ilkley
Year of birth missing (living people)